NGC 2027 (also known as ESO 86-SC13) is a 12th magnitude open cluster located in the Dorado constellation which is also part of the Large Magellanic Cloud and was discovered by James Dunlop on November 6, 1826. Its apparent diameter is 0.7 arcminutes.

References

Open clusters
ESO objects
2027
Dorado (constellation)
Large Magellanic Cloud
Astronomical objects discovered in 1826
Discoveries by James Dunlop